István Pásztor (2 January 1926 – 2 January 2015) was a Hungarian cyclist. He competed in the 4,000 metres team pursuit at the 1952 Summer Olympics.

References

1926 births
2015 deaths
Hungarian male cyclists
Olympic cyclists of Hungary
Cyclists at the 1952 Summer Olympics
Cyclists from Budapest